An ice shanty (also called an ice shack, ice house, fishing shanty, fish house, fish coop, bobhouse, ice hut, or darkhouse) is a portable shed placed on a frozen lake to provide shelter during ice fishing. They can be as small and cheap as a plastic tarp draped over a frame of two-by-fours, or as expensive as a small cabin with heat, bunks, electricity, and cooking facilities.

More durable ice houses are generally left on a lake for the duration of the ice fishing season, although this can cause problems, such as thaws and re-freezing causing houses to be immoveably frozen onto the lake. Lighter, cheaper versions can collapse into a package to be moved from lake to lake during the season.

Many northern communities have developed bodies of laws about the operation of ice shanties - frequently including dates by which they must be removed, even if the ice can still hold them.

Folklore 
In northern climates, ice shanties are the center of a large, often humorous, folklore.  Fishermen often decorate their ice shanties in humorous ways (toilets are a popular joke addition), while others studiously work on ways to make their ice shanties more comfortable and efficient. Much of the folklore involves the inherent danger of erecting a structure atop a frozen pond. The mayor of Hudson, Ohio claimed ice shanties could lead to increases in prostitution, although WJW (TV) could find no evidence of this.

References

Further reading

 

Portable buildings and shelters
shanty
Fishing equipment